Bakani is a census town in Jhalawar district in the state of Rajasthan, India.

Demographics
 India census, Bakani had a population of 17938. Males constitute 52% of the population and females 48%. Bakani has an literacy rate of 65%, higher than the national average of 59.5%; with 62% of the males and 38% of females literate. 16% of the population is under 6 years of age. Khera is nearest village in Bakani. This village is popular in education, agriculture crop orange, garlic and onion.

References

Cities and towns in Jhalawar district